Le Forêt may refer to:
La Forêt de Saisy
"Le Forêt", song by composer André Caplet